Rania Rahali (born 20 November 1990) is a Tunisian sailor. She competed in the Nacra 17 event at the 2020 Summer Olympics.

References

External links
 

1990 births
Living people
Tunisian female sailors (sport)
Olympic sailors of Tunisia
Sailors at the 2020 Summer Olympics – Nacra 17
Place of birth missing (living people)
21st-century Tunisian women